The fourteenth season of American Idol, also known as American Idol XIV, premiered on the Fox television network on January 7, 2015. Ryan Seacrest continues his role as host, while Jennifer Lopez, Keith Urban and Harry Connick Jr. returned for their respective fourth, third and second times as judges. Randy Jackson stepped down as mentor, being replaced by Scott Borchetta. Long-time sponsor Coca-Cola ended its relationship with the show. This was the fourth season to have an all-male finale and the third season where the final two contestants had never been in the bottom group prior to the finale.

Before the finale, it was announced that the fifteenth season would be the last of the reality show. Since the series began in 2002 it peaked in viewership at 30 million viewers per episode in 2006, slipping to 20 million viewers per episode in 2011, and down further since with an average of about 9.15 million viewers per episode in 2015.

On May 13, Nick Fradiani was announced the winner of the season, with Clark Beckham as runner-up.

Changes 
The fourteenth season of American Idol featured a number of major changes to its format and talent. Some of these changes came in response to the falling popularity and viewership of Idol in comparison to NBC's competing series The Voice; viewership of the thirteenth season had fallen by 27%. Former judge Randy Jackson, who served as a mentor on the previous season, left the show and was succeeded by Big Machine Records founder Scott Borchetta. In May 2014, Ryan Seacrest signed a two-year extension to remain host of Idol through 2016, which would be the show's final season. Long-time sponsor Coca-Cola ended its relationship with the series, and the Ford Motor Company maintained a reduced role.

To evaluate their ability to perform in front of a live audience, the final 48 contestants participated in a private concert at the House of Blues in West Hollywood before being cut to 24.  Separate results shows during the top 12 round were discontinued, in favor of a single two-hour broadcast on Wednesday nights; results from the previous week were revealed during the following week's show, similarly to Dancing with the Stars. A new feature known as the "Fan Save" was also introduced, in which viewers could vote via Twitter to decide which of the bottom two singers from the previous week would advance.

The finale returned to the Dolby Theatre, where five of the first six-season finales took place.

Idol Fan Save
Beginning in the top eight, American Idol introduced the Twitter-powered Idol Fan Save, similar to the Instant Save first introduced in another show The Voice. At some point during every show, the two contestants who received the lowest votes from the previous week were revealed.  The bottom two contestants then performed in exactly the same format as the safe contestants. However, after the performances were completed, the viewers only had five minutes to vote by tweeting about which of the bottom two contestants should be saved; one contestant with a higher vote count will receive the save and eliminating the other. Viewers in the Eastern and Central time zones vote during the live broadcasts; due to taping delays, viewers in the Mountain and Pacific time zones are cued to vote to save contestants on the show's official Twitter account during the live East coast broadcast.

Regional auditions
Auditions took place in the following cities:

For the New York auditions, Adam Lambert replaced Urban who took time off to be with his wife, Nicole Kidman, after the death of her father.
The American Idol "Audition Bus Tour" visit the cities of:  Portland, Oregon; Portland, Maine; Reno, Nevada; Columbus, Ohio; Richmond, Virginia; Albuquerque, New Mexico; Amarillo, Texas; Myrtle Beach, South Carolina; Branson, Missouri; Tallahassee, Florida; and Kansas City, Missouri.

Hollywood week
Hollywood Week aired in four parts over two weeks. They were filmed in late October 2014.  Contestants participated in three rounds: lines of ten, groups and solos. The judges also asked some of the most notable contestants to sing for them at the beginning of the rounds, surprising many of them, but they all advanced. After Hollywood Week, contestants performed in the Showcase round in front of a live audience at the House of Blues in Los Angeles.

Semi-finals
The semi-finals began on February 25, 2015, and continued for four episodes. They were filmed at The Fillmore in Detroit, Michigan. They top 24 episodes were filmed February 19, 2015. The male contestants aired on Wednesday, February 25, 2015. The female contestants aired on Thursday, February 26, 2015. Those who obtained the most votes per gender group advanced onto the Top 16 and sang a song from Motown to hopefully advance further the following week. The top 16 episodes were filmed March 4, 2015, and March 5, 2015.  After ten contestants were chosen to perform in the finals based on the public vote, the six semi-finalists were eligible for their Instant Wildcard pick. The judges only picked two contestants to perform in the finals.

Semi-finalists

The following is a list of Top 24 semi-finalists who were not selected to perform and failed to reach the second round of the semi-finals:

The following is a list of Top 16 semi-finalists who failed to reach the finals:

Color key:

Top 24 – Contestant's Choice

Top 16 – Motown

Finalists

 Nick Fradiani (born November 15, 1985) is from Guilford, Connecticut. Fradiani was the vocalist of Beach Avenue which got recognition after they won in the Battle of the Bands at Mohegan Sun in 2011. They auditioned for the ninth season of America's Got Talent, but were eliminated during Judgement Week. His father was a musician, who performs in clubs and in cruise ships. He taught his son to play drums, piano and guitar. Fradiani graduated in high school in 2004. He has a bachelor's degree in History from Wheaton College in Norton, Massachusetts. He resumed his music career by playing solo gigs. Fradiani continuously got gigs with his band, which was on hiatus during his participation on Idol. He and his girlfriend auditioned in New York City, and his golden ticket song was Peter Gabriel's "In Your Eyes". During Hollywood Week, he sang "Babylon" by David Gray. He sang Train's "Drops of Jupiter (Tell Me)" during the House of Blues Showcase, earning his spot in the Top 24. He was the third alumnus of America's Got Talent to be a finalist in Idol, with his predecessors Thia Megia of the tenth season and eleventh season runner-up Jessica Sanchez. He was announced as the winner on May 13.
 Clark Beckham (born May 15, 1992) is from White House, Tennessee. He was a musician in the streets of Nashville. Beckham's father was a professional musician, playing guitar for the Righteous Brothers and Dolly Parton. His mother was a court reporter before she quit her job to be a music teacher. He attended Lee University, a Christian-liberal arts school in Cleveland, Tennessee. He was studying to be a teacher in history and physical education. He competed in the Battle of the Bands and toured with the campus choir. Beckham plays a number of instruments. At the age of nine, he started playing drums. He played guitar at the age of twelve and piano at the age of sixteen. In a Christian Post interview Beckham noted he was a worship leader and feels God is his biggest influence. He prayed on whether to audition for Idol and plans to continue with a career in Christian music following the competition. Beckham sang James Brown's "It's a Man's World" during his audition. In his first solo performance in Hollywood rounds, he sang Otis Reding's "Try a Little Tenderness". He advances in the Top 24 after he sang "Georgia on My Mind" by Ray Charles in the House of Blues Showcase Week. He cites Marvin Gaye, Stevie Wonder, Al Green, Michael Jackson and Michael Bublé as his musical influences. He was announced as the runner-up.

 Jax is from East Brunswick, New Jersey. Singing since she was five, she taught herself how to play the piano. At the age of twelve, she moved to New York City and left public school for home-schooling to pursue her music career with a professional voice coach in New York City. Her father was a firefighter in New York City who was injured during the September 11, 2001 attacks and retired, because of this he was able to accompany, and bond with her at lessons, shows, auditions, and recordings. In high school, she starred in musicals such as "Aladdin" and "Annie". She was also a member of about five bands and ended up touring a lot. In mid-2014, Jax studied at New York University in London where she won a BMI John Lennon songwriting program. She auditioned in New York City with her rendition of The Beatles' "I Want to Hold Your Hand". She also sang "Toxic" by Britney Spears during her first solo audition in Hollywood Week. For her final solo performance, she sang The Beatles' "Let it Be". She earned her spot in the Top 24 in the House of Blues Showcase after she performed Lady Gaga's "You & I". She was the last female contestant eliminated on May 12, coming in third place. Prior to her elimination, Jax had never been in the bottom 2.
 Rayvon Owen (born June 27, 1991) is a vocal coach from Richmond, Virginia. At his young age, he sang with the Sunbeam Choir at Antioch Baptist Church. He joined the Richmond Boys Choir in middle school and later, joined the Harlem Boys Choir. He graduated from Henrico High School's Center for the Arts. He attended college at Belmont University in Nashville, Tennessee. He auditioned in San Francisco with his rendition of Katy Perry's "Wide Awake". Owen sang "Ordinary People" by John Legend in his first solo performance and Otis Reding's "Try a Little Tenderness" in his final solo performance, during Hollywood week. He performed during the Showcase week in the House of Blues with Sam Smith's "Lay Me Down", earning his spot in the semi-finals.  He cites Lionel Richie, John Legend, Katy Perry, and Stevie Wonder as his musical influences. He was eliminated on May 6, coming in fourth place.
 Tyanna Jones (born August 8, 1998) is from Jacksonville, Florida. Jones is the middle of eleven children. She spent months living homeless with her family in the local pastor church. She started singing with the choir as voice major in Douglas Anderson School of the Arts at the age of five She and her mother flew to San Francisco, which was the last venue of auditions, after they earned enough money for the trip. For her audition, she sang "Wings" by Little Mix, to earn her ticket. During the Hollywood Rounds, she sang Olly Murs' "Dance with Me Tonight" in her first solo performance and "Try" by Colbie Caillat in her final solo performance. She performed during the Showcase week in the House of Blues with Beyoncé's "Love on Top", earning her spot in the semi-finals. She cites Prince, Michael Jackson and Beyonce as musical influences. She was eliminated on April 29, coming in fifth place.
 Quentin Alexander (born December 11, 1994) is from New Orleans, Louisiana. Alexander's mentor and drama instructor at school, Troy Populous, encouraged him to channel his creative energy into drama class. Populous could see Alexander had charisma, an 'it' factor, and Alexander agreed that he was able to channel his frustration into "something beautiful, which at the time was theater." Alexander says that many artists have made impacts on him with a few of his biggest inspirations as Erykah Badu, David Bowie, Andre 3000, Jimi Hendrix, Lenny Kravitz, Lorde, Sia "and the list goes on for miles." He sang "Royals" by Lorde for his audition in New Orleans. During the final round of Hollywood week, he sang "Riptide" by Vance Joy. He earns the spot in the Top 24 after he sang "Youth" by Foxes during the showcase week in the House of Blues. He was eliminated on April 22, coming in sixth place.
 Joey Cook (born March 30, 1991) is a street busker originally from Woodbridge, Virginia who moved to New Orleans. When she is not working, she performs in the streets of Richmond. During her audition, she performed "King of Spain" by The Tallest Man on Earth. Cook sang Miranda Lambert's "Kerosene" during her first solo performance in the Hollywood rounds. She also sang "Across the Universe" by The Beatles for her final solo round performance. Cook landed the spot in the top 24 after she performed "Sweet Pea" by Amos Lee in the House of Blues Showcase Round. Her performance of Fancy during the top 11 was well received by the judges and earned a standing ovation from Keith Urban.  She played the accordion, ukulele, banjo, as well as the mandolin during the course of the season.  Joey is a member of the band Mammoth Indigo. She was eliminated on April 15, coming in seventh place.
 Qaasim Middleton (born January 13, 1995) is from Brooklyn, New York. He is the son of actors and professional musicians Keith Middleton and Toni Seawright. His mother was Miss Mississippi in 1987. She has sung backing vocals for Tina Turner, Teena Marie and Laura Branigan, among many others. His father was a cast member of the stage musical, "Stomp" for 20 years. Middleton was formerly a musician and actor in Nickelodeon's television show The Naked Brothers Band. He auditioned in New York City with "Sir Duke" by Stevie Wonder. He performed Ed Sheeran's "Give Me Love" during his final Hollywood solo round. He sang "Satisfaction" by Allen Stone, earning his spot in the Top 24 in the House of Blues showcase week. Middleton was the recipient of the one and only "judges' save" of the season, which kept him from elimination during the second week of the Top 11. However, he was eliminated on April 8, coming in eighth place.
 Daniel Seavey (born April 2, 1999) is from Vancouver, Washington. Seavey was a sophomore student at Union High School in Camas. At his young age, He played guitar, violin, cello, viola, piano, mandolin, ukulele, bass and drums. His father was a pastor at Living Water Community Church. He sang Leonard Cohen's "Hallelujah" & Paula Abdul's "Straight Up" during his audition in San Francisco. During the Hollywood Rounds, he sang Ed Sheeran's "Thinking Out Loud" in his first solo performance and "I See Fire", also sung by Sheeran, in his final solo performance. He performed again "Straight Up" in the House of Blues, earning his spot in the top 24. Seavey was the youngest contestant at the age of 15 to compete in the show. He was eliminated on April 1, coming in ninth place. Seavey would later join the group Why Don't We.
 Adanna Duru (born October 10, 1996) is a student from Diamond Bar, California. At the age of 10, Duru wrote her first song, "Come Back to Me". She played guitar and piano on the song, which was about world peace. She performed in musicals during middle school. For three years, she was a member of her high school choir. She was a contestant on the third season of The Voice where she was defaulted to Adam Levine's team, but was eliminated in the Battle Rounds. She auditioned in San Francisco with Lady Gaga's "You & I". She performed "It's a Man's, Man's, Man's World" by James Brown during the House of Blues Showcase where she got standing ovation by Jennifer Lopez, earning her spot in the Top 24. Adanna's biggest musical influences are Michael Jackson, Justin Timberlake, Janet Jackson, Beyoncé and Lady Gaga. She was eliminated on March 25, along with Maddie Walker, tied at tenth place.
 Maddie Walker (born December 23, 1997) is from Ankeny, Iowa. She previously auditioned in the thirteenth season but was cut during the group round on Hollywood Week. She returned to audition again in New York City with Gwen Sebastian's "Suitcase". She sang "Already Gone" by Sugarland during her first solo round in Hollywood week. She also sang "Don't Ya" by Brett Eldredge in her final solo performance. During the House of Blues Showcase, she sang "Big Girls Don't Cry". She was cut during the top 24 selection but was called back by the judges, whom they were undecided, to have a sing-off with fellow singer, Rachel Hallack, to earn the spot in the semi-finals. Thus, the judges decided to send Walker through the Top 24. She was eliminated on March 25, along with Adanna Duru, tied at tenth place.
 Sarina-Joi Crowe (born June 27, 1995) is a musician from Columbia, Tennessee. She originally auditioned for the tenth season of American Idol, but was cut on the last day of the Hollywood Round. Crowe also auditioned for the twelfth and thirteenth seasons, where she was cut in the green mile round. For her fourth appearance, she returned to audition in Nashville, Tennessee with "Love Runs Out" by OneRepublic. She sang Jessie J's "Big White Room" in the House of Blues Showcase Week where she was able to earn her spot in the Top 24. She was the first finalist to be eliminated on March 12, coming in twelfth place.

Live show summary
In this season, there were ten weeks of the finals, consisting of eleven live shows, and twelve finalists, with one finalist eliminated per week based on the American public's votes. They were filmed at CBS Television City in Hollywood, California. Scott Borchetta replaced Randy Jackson as finalists' in-house mentor.

Color key:

Top 12 – Back to the Start

Top 11 (first week) – Party Songs
Sarina-Joi Crowe performed "Neon Lights" in the Top 11 night for the Judges' Save. However, the judges chose not save her, resulting in her elimination.

Top 11 (second week) – Songs from the Cinema
 Guest mentor: Nile Rodgers

Top 9 – Songs from the '80s
 Guest mentor: Boy George

Beginning this week, the studio versions of each contestant performance were available at iTunes. Also introduced this week is "Fan Save" where the bottom two contestants will compete via tweets to save a contestant from elimination. The "Fan Save" run for the next four weeks until Top 5.

Top 8 – Kelly Clarkson
Daniel Seavey performed "Breakaway" in the Top 8 night for the Twitter fan save. He was part of the Top 9 week's Bottom two alongside Rayvon Owen. However, he was eliminated and did not advance.

Guest Mentor: Kelly Clarkson

Top 7 – Billboard Hot 100
Qaasim Middletion performed "Hey Ya!" in the Top 7 night for the Twitter fan save. He was part of the Top 8 week's Bottom two alongside Rayvon Owen. However, he was eliminated and did not advance.

 Guest mentors: Jason Derulo & Florida Georgia Line

Top 6 – American Classics
For the first time in the competition, each finalist performed two songs. Joey Cook performed "My Funny Valentine" and "Somebody to Love" in the Top 6 night for the Twitter fan save. She was part of the Top 7 week's Bottom two alongside Rayvon Owen. However, she was eliminated and did not advance.

Top 5 – Arena Anthems
The American Idol Tour which in years past included the top ten on tour had changed to include only the top five finalists so this week the finalists who moved forward were considered as part of the annual summer tour of AI finalists. Quentin Alexander performed "Light My Fire" and "Shake It Out" in the Top 5 night for the Twitter fan save. He was part of the Top 6 week's Bottom two alongside Rayvon Owen. However, he was eliminated and did not advance.

Top 4 – Judges' Hometown / Soul
Guest mentors: Martina McBride and Jay DeMarcus
The finalists took on songs of the Judges’ hometowns and their own soul.

Top 3 – Scott Borchetta's Choice / Hometown Dedication / Judges' Choice 
Contestants performed three songs, a song decided by in-house mentor Scott Borchetta, one dedicating for the hometown, and one selected by the judges. Rayvon Owen performed "Want to Want Me", "As", and "You Are So Beautiful" in the Top 3 night for a spot in the top three. However, he have revealed to have a lower vote count and did not advance.

Top 2 – Favorite Performance / Simon Fuller's Choice / Winner's Single

Elimination chart
Color key:

Controversy

Quentin Alexander incident
National media outlets reported on an exchange between judge Harry Connick Jr. and contestant Quentin Alexander noting the incident of Connick scolding a contestant was awkward. On the live airing of the Top 6 show, there was three contestants who had not been saved when Alexander was chosen. After he performed, host Ryan Seacrest noted that he appeared to be upset. When asked Alexander responded "This sucks, We've got two of the best vocalists, my best friend [Joey Cook] sitting over there. This whole thing is whack, but I'm going to shut up right now." Seacrest then replied saying that this is a competition, and with the save anything could happen. When Alexander had left the stage, Connick Jr. said, "Quentin, if it's that whack, then you can always go home, because Idol is paying a lot of money to give you this experience and for you to say that to this hand that is feeding you right now, I think is highly disrespectful." Alexander was then prompted by the producers to return to the stage where he approached the judges and clarified he meant the two being potentially eliminated was whack, not the show, or the experience. Later, after performing his second song, he explained "I understand that these things are going to happen, and I just didn't want my friend to leave" and apologized. Judge Jennifer Lopez empathized with Alexander's emotions running high but said that as an artist he had to learn to work through that even when it happens to put on the performance. Joey Cook commented after being eliminated on Alexander's statements: I pretty much just told him what he did was beautiful, in my opinion, and it was the perfect representation of him. Quentin is a very emotional person. He’s very 'all cards on the table.' There is no sugar coating. He doesn’t hide his emotions. He’s honest. He’s a raw human being, and I think what happened last night was the perfect example of that and how emotional of a person he is.

The producers played up the exchange in what Music Times termed "what seemed like shady circumstances" to replay the incident throughout the week in show promos and at the beginning of the Top 5 show. An AI source also stated that for fairness purposes the judges and contestants have a strict wall of silence between them and only interact onstage so Connick Jr. and Alexander have not had contact since last week. Alexander was eliminated the next show the following week with what Music Times questioned as possibly the first time American Idol "went into an episode with what seemed to be a very clear agenda." Yahoo'''s managing editor Lyndsey Parker detailed many points that she argued was American Idol "throwing Quentin Alexander under the tour bus" referring to the idiom of throw under the bus by sacrificing a friend as the show heavily promotes the summer tour which only guarantees the top five finalists will be included. Included in her critique was that the show had aired the promotional video featuring the confrontation which she characterized as "misleadingly edited" to boost ratings which have been historically low, had a surprisingly few negative judges comments, and instead lavish praise for other contestants while Alexander's was pointedly negative, and what Parker saw as a "backhanded and unflattering" exchange from Connick Jr. insinuating Alexander needed Auto-Tune. She also noted that the "Fan Save" portion was handled uniquely in that the other contestant Rayvon Owen didn't have a replay or critique until after a commercial break, while Alexander did not get the same treatment, and host Ryan Seacrest claimed Alexander had muttered "I give up" which Alexander had to clarify was actually "I give it up." USA Today echoed the sentiment stating that the awkward moments probably led to his elimination.

Guest performances

Reception
U.S. Nielsen ratings

The season premiere was watched by 11.2 million viewers; down 25% from the thirteenth season's premiere (which had an audience of 15.19 million viewers). However, it was up 6.3% from the thirteenth season's finale (which had an audience of 10.53 million viewers), the second time in the show's history.  Currently, the most-viewed episode this season was the "Minneapolis Auditions," which aired on January 21, 2015, and the episode with the fewest viewers tuning in was the "Top 7 Perform: Billboard Hits," which aired on April 8, 2015. This episode now takes the top spot as the least-viewed and worst-rated American Idol episode ever, with 6.58 viewers.  The title was previously held by the thirteenth season's "The Final 2," which was watched by 6.76 million viewers on May 20, 2014. The average viewership in millions for the audition episodes was 10.84.  The "Top 10 Perform: Movie Night" episode was moved to Thursday night, to make way for the two-hour finale of Empire.'' This season, there was a two part finale, with the first of two parts airing on Tuesday, May 12, 2015, at 9/8c. The second of the two-part-finale aired on Wednesday, May 13, 2015, at 8/7c.

Music releases
Music releases

Concert tour

The top five finalists performed in the American Idol tour that year.

References

American Idol seasons
2015 American television seasons
2015 in American music